Psalmopoeus cambridgei, the Trinidad chevron tarantula, is a species of spider in the family Theraphosidae, endemic to Trinidad. Its venom is the source of psalmotoxin and vanillotoxin which are classified as inhibitor cystine knot proteins. Psalmotoxin may be of therapeutic use in patients with a stroke.

Description

The female has chevron-shaped dark markings on the abdomen and her color varies through shades of green and brown with characteristic red or orange flashes on the legs. The mature male is sexually dimorphic, colored a more uniform grey or brown, the body appearing smaller in comparison to the diagonal leg span, reaching five inches (12 cm) on average. Males can reach maturity in as little as one year. The female is very large and fast-growing, reaching seven inches (18 cm) in leg span. It feeds readily and makes an attractive display animal, being fairly active when given correct housing conditions. Spiderlings of this species are very opportunistic and will usually create a home in a small crevice hidden with a silken blanket covered in soil.

Biology
Arboreal tarantulas live singly in specially constructed silken tube webs or in crevices, behind loose bark or among epiphytic plants. The Trinidad chevron tarantula hunts bats, frogs, lizards, grasshoppers, mice, crickets, and other insects. The Trinidad chevron tarantula breeds freely in captivity. Two silken egg sacs are commonly produced from one mating and each of these contains one hundred to one hundred and fifty eggs. The female spider guards the sac, turning it occasionally, and the eggs hatch after about six weeks. The spiderlings usually disperse at the first instar stage.

Etymology
The name cambridgei is in honour of the arachnologist Frederick Octavius Pickard-Cambridge.

References

Theraphosidae
Endemic fauna of Trinidad and Tobago
Spiders of the Caribbean
Spiders described in 1895